Keratinocyte growth factor is a protein that in humans is encoded by the FGF7 gene.

Function 

The protein encoded by this gene is a member of the fibroblast growth factor (FGF) family. FGF family members possess broad mitogenic and cell survival activities, and are involved in a variety of biological processes, including embryonic development, cell growth, morphogenesis, tissue repair, tumor growth and invasion. This protein is a potent epithelial cell-specific growth factor, whose mitogenic activity is predominantly exhibited in keratinocytes but not in fibroblasts and endothelial cells. Studies of mouse and rat homologs of this gene implicated roles in morphogenesis of epithelium, reepithelialization of wounds, hair development and early lung organogenesis.

Interactions 

FGF7 has been shown to interact with Perlecan.

References

Further reading